Katayevo is a rural locality (a village) in Domshinskoye Rural Settlement, Sheksninsky District, Vologda Oblast, Russia. The population was 24 as of 2002.

Geography 
Katayevo is located 43 km southeast of Sheksna (the district's administrative centre) by road. Beloye is the nearest rural locality.

References 

Rural localities in Sheksninsky District